Lake Itkul is situated in the north of the Chelyabinsk Oblast, 20 kilometers from the town of Verkhny Ufaley. Lake Itkul was declared a natural monument. 

The lake is surrounded by low summits of the Ural Mountains, the highest of them being Karabayka (544 m) on the southwestern shore of Lake Itkul. Here in Lake Itkul small river flows Karabayka. 

Lakes of Chelyabinsk Oblast